Omaha City Hall is located at 1819 Farnam Street in downtown Omaha, Nebraska. It is the seat of government for the City of Omaha.

See also 
 History of Omaha, Nebraska

References

External links 
 Modern photo

Government of Omaha, Nebraska
City and town halls in Nebraska